La Farge, LaFarge or Lafarge can refer to:

People
  Antoinette LaFarge (1966–), American artist and writer
  Christopher Grant LaFarge (1862–1938), American architect and partner in the firm Heins & LaFarge
  Christopher Grant La Farge (author) (1897–1956), American author
 Guy Lafarge, songwriter for France in the Eurovision Song Contest 1957
 Henri Pavin de Lafarge (1889–1965), French businessman and politician
 Jean-Baptiste Lafarge, actor in La Crème de la crème
  John La Farge (1835–1910), American stained glass artist and writer
  John LaFarge, Jr. (1880–1963), American Jesuit priest
  L. Bancel LaFarge (1900–1989), American architect
  Marie Lafarge (1816–1852), French murderer
  Oliver La Farge (1901–1963), American writer and anthropologist
  Paul La Farge (1970–2023), American novelist
  Peter La Farge (1931–1965), American folk singer
  Pokey LaFarge (1983–), American musician and songwriter

Fictional characters
 Henri LaFarge, butler in A Shot in the Dark
 Kenneth Lafarge, character in the novel Drakon

Companies
 Lafarge (company), French industrial company 
 LafargeHolcim, merger of Holcim and Lafarge cement firms
 Lafarge Tarmac, British industrial company

Places
 Gare de Lafarge, a train station in Saint-Hilaire-les-Places, France
 La Farge, a village in Wisconsin, United States
 Lafarge Falls, in Hamilton, Ontario, Canada
 Lafarge Lake, in British Columbia, Canada
 Lafarge Rocks, near the Antarctic Peninsula
 Lafarge Lake–Douglas Station, the SkyTrain terminus station of the Evergreen Line extension to Coquitlam, in Metro Vancouver, Canada
 La Fargeville, New York, a hamlet in New York, United States